Carex nodiflora is a tussock-forming species of perennial sedge in the family Cyperaceae. It is native to parts of the Philippines.

See also
List of Carex species

References

nodiflora
Taxa named by Johann Otto Boeckeler
Plants described in 1884
Flora of the Philippines